Rimouski is a city in Bas-Saint-Laurent region of Quebec, Canada.

Rimouski  may also refer to:
 Rimouski (provincial electoral district), a provincial electoral district of Quebec
 Rimouski (electoral district), a former federal electoral district in Canada
 Rimouski Airport
 Rimouski River, a river in Quebec
 Roman Catholic Archdiocese of Rimouski

See also
 Rimouski-Neigette, a Regional County Municipality
 Rimouski-Neigette—Témiscouata—Les Basques, a federal riding of Canada
 Université du Québec à Rimouski
 Zec de la Rivière-Rimouski, a zone d'exploitation contrôlée (controlled harvesting zone)